Tritopterna is a genus of moths belonging to the subfamily Olethreutinae of the family Tortricidae.

Species
Tritopterna anachastopa (Meyrick, 1934)
Tritopterna anastrepta (Meyrick, 1927)
Tritopterna capyra (Meyrick, 1911)
Tritopterna chionostoma Meyrick, 1921
Tritopterna eocnephaea (Meyrick, 1935)
Tritopterna galena (Meyrick, 1935)

See also
List of Tortricidae genera

References

External links
tortricidae.com

Tortricidae genera
Olethreutinae
Taxa named by Edward Meyrick